Ľubica Laššáková (born 18 August 1960) was the Minister of Culture of Slovakia, serving from 22 March 2018 to 21 March 2020. She is a member of Direction – Social Democracy. In 2019, she reduced the budgets of LGBT organizations in Slovakia against the advice of the ministry's experts, sparking calls for her resignation.

References

1960 births
Living people
Culture ministers of Slovakia
Direction – Social Democracy politicians
Members of the National Council (Slovakia) 2020-present
Female members of the National Council (Slovakia)